Uchkus Inkañan (Quechua uchku hole, opening Inka Inca, ñan road, route, hispanicized spellings Uchcus Incañan, Uchkus Incanan, Uchkus Incañan) is an archaeological site in the Huancavelica Region in Peru. It is located in the Huancavelica Province, Yauli District.

References 

Archaeological sites in Peru
Archaeological sites in Huancavelica Region